This is a list of electoral division results for the Australian 1987 federal election in the state of New South Wales.

Overall results

Results by division

Banks 
 This section is an excerpt from Electoral results for the Division of Banks § 1987

Barton 
 This section is an excerpt from Electoral results for the Division of Barton § 1987

Bennelong 
 This section is an excerpt from Electoral results for the Division of Bennelong § 1987

Berowra 
 This section is an excerpt from Electoral results for the Division of Berowra § 1987

Blaxland 
 This section is an excerpt from Electoral results for the Division of Blaxland § 1987

Bradfield 
 This section is an excerpt from Electoral results for the Division of Bradfield § 1987

Calare 
 This section is an excerpt from Electoral results for the Division of Calare § 1987

Charlton 
 This section is an excerpt from Electoral results for the Division of Charlton § 1987

Chifley 
 This section is an excerpt from Electoral results for the Division of Chifley § 1987

Cook 
 This section is an excerpt from Electoral results for the Division of Cook § 1987

Cowper 
 This section is an excerpt from Electoral results for the Division of Cowper § 1987

Cunningham 
 This section is an excerpt from Electoral results for the Division of Cunningham § 1987

Dobell 
 This section is an excerpt from Electoral results for the Division of Dobell § 1987

Dundas 
 This section is an excerpt from Electoral results for the Division of Dundas § 1987

Eden-Monaro 
 This section is an excerpt from Electoral results for the Division of Eden-Monaro § 1987

Farrer 
 This section is an excerpt from Electoral results for the Division of Farrer § 1987

Fowler 
 This section is an excerpt from Electoral results for the Division of Fowler § 1987

Gilmore 
 This section is an excerpt from Electoral results for the Division of Gilmore § 1987

Grayndler 
 This section is an excerpt from Electoral results for the Division of Grayndler § 1987

Greenway 
 This section is an excerpt from Electoral results for the Division of Greenway § 1987

Gwydir 
 This section is an excerpt from Electoral results for the Division of Gwydir § 1987

Hughes 
 This section is an excerpt from Electoral results for the Division of Hughes § 1987

Hume 
 This section is an excerpt from Electoral results for the Division of Hume § 1987

Hunter 
 This section is an excerpt from Electoral results for the Division of Hunter § 1987

Kingsford Smith 
 This section is an excerpt from Electoral results for the Division of Kingsford Smith § 1987

Lindsay 
 This section is an excerpt from Electoral results for the Division of Lindsay § 1987

Lowe 
 This section is an excerpt from Electoral results for the Division of Lowe § 1987

Lyne 
 This section is an excerpt from Electoral results for the Division of Lyne § 1987

Macarthur 
 This section is an excerpt from Electoral results for the Division of Macarthur § 1987

Mackellar 
 This section is an excerpt from Electoral results for the Division of Mackellar § 1987

Macquarie 
 This section is an excerpt from Electoral results for the Division of Macquarie § 1987

Mitchell 
 This section is an excerpt from Electoral results for the Division of Mitchell § 1987

New England 
 This section is an excerpt from Electoral results for the Division of New England § 1987

Newcastle 
 This section is an excerpt from Electoral results for the Division of Newcastle § 1987

North Sydney 
 This section is an excerpt from Electoral results for the Division of North Sydney § 1987

Page 
 This section is an excerpt from Electoral results for the Division of Page § 1987

Parkes 
 This section is an excerpt from Electoral results for the Division of Parkes § 1987

Parramatta 
 This section is an excerpt from Electoral results for the Division of Parramatta § 1987

Phillip 
 This section is an excerpt from Electoral results for the Division of Phillip § 1987

Prospect 
 This section is an excerpt from Electoral results for the Division of Prospect § 1987

Reid 
 This section is an excerpt from Electoral results for the Division of Reid § 1987

Richmond 
 This section is an excerpt from Electoral results for the Division of Richmond § 1987

Riverina-Darling 
 This section is an excerpt from Electoral results for the Division of Riverina-Darling § 1987

Robertson 
 This section is an excerpt from Electoral results for the Division of Robertson § 1987

Shortland 
 This section is an excerpt from Electoral results for the Division of Shortland § 1987

St George 
 This section is an excerpt from Electoral results for the Division of St George § 1987

Sydney 
 This section is an excerpt from Electoral results for the Division of Sydney § 1987

Throsby 
 This section is an excerpt from Electoral results for the Division of Throwsby § 1987

Warringah 
 This section is an excerpt from Electoral results for the Division of Warringah § 1987

Wentworth 
 This section is an excerpt from Electoral results for the Division of Wentworth § 1987

Werriwa 
 This section is an excerpt from Electoral results for the Division of Werriwa § 1987

See also 
 Results of the 1987 Australian federal election (House of Representatives)
 Members of the Australian House of Representatives, 1987–1990

Notes

References 

New South Wales 1987